Lake Couchiching, from the Ojibwe gojijiing meaning "inlet", is a medium-sized lake in Central Ontario, Canada, separated from Lake Simcoe by a narrow channel.

Lakes Simcoe and Couchiching are popular spots for fishing in summer and ice fishing in winter.

Singer-songwriter Gordon Lightfoot paid homage to the lake in the song "Couchiching".

The Couchiching Institute on Public Affairs holds its annual conference on the shores of the lake every August. Camp Couchiching is also located near the lake.

Geography

The Trent-Severn Waterway enters Lake Simcoe by the Talbot River and exits this lake by the Severn River which empties into Georgian Bay.

The city of Orillia is located on the narrow channel connecting this lake with Lake Simcoe.

Water quality
In a 2012 study, the lake showed a microalgae density of 2.4 × 10^7/cm^2, with a high species diversity. The lake showed low total phosphorus and high organic carbon content, when compared to Lake Simcoe.

See also
 Mnjikaning Fish Weirs

References

External links
 

Couchiching, Lake
Landforms of Simcoe County
Trent–Severn Waterway